Thorpe-in-Balne railway station was an unopened railway station on the Hull and Barnsley and Great Central Joint Railway.

Like the other stations on the line it was built ready to accept passenger trains with flanking platforms and facilities, however the passengers never came. Although it was built ready for the opening on 1 May 1916 the line only opened for goods traffic, particularly coal, it stayed that way all its working life.

The structures remained in position until the early 1960s when they were demolished.

The line saw very few passenger workings, all of them enthusiasts specials, the final one being the "Doncaster Decoy" on 5 October 1968.

References 
"Great Central", Vol.3 (Fay sets the pace), Ian Allan / Locomotive Pub. Co., 1965. 
"Railways in South Yorkshire", C.T.Goode, Dalesman Publications 1975. 

Disused railway stations in Doncaster
Unbuilt railway stations in the United Kingdom